Gnome Wave Cleaner (GWC) is a digital audio editor application. The graphical user interface for the editor has been produced employing GTK+ for the GUI widgets. Its primary author is Jeff Welty.

Gnome Wave Cleaner is free and open-source software subject to the terms of the GPL-2.0-or-later.

Features 
Gnome Wave Cleaner's primary purpose is to clean up poor quality recordings, such as those captured from old 78 rpm phonograph records. It provides tools for removing noise by spectral subtraction and for removing clicks by least squares autoregressive interpolation. It is also capable of automatically marking song boundaries, and developing TOC records for creating music Compact Discs from the cleaned audio file. As it uses libsndfile for audio I/O, it can read and write most audio file and data formats.

See also 
 Noise reduction

 List of free software for audio
 List of Linux audio software

External links
 Converting 78 rpm Records to Modern Media on Linux
  Vinyl Music Processing under Linux
 Gnome Wave Cleaner Project Web site

Audio editing software that uses GTK
Free audio software
Free audio editors
Free software programmed in C
Digital audio editors for Linux